Oskar Stein Bjørlykke (born 4 December 1939) is a Norwegian poet, novelist and children's writer.

He made his literary debut in 1966 with the poetry collection Deg høyrer dagen til. Among his novels are Reise til september from 1968 and Dropar from 2000.

Among his children's books are Kom til dammen! from 2003, which was awarded the Critics Prize for the year's best children's or youth's literature.

References

1939 births
Living people
20th-century Norwegian poets
Norwegian male poets
20th-century Norwegian novelists
21st-century Norwegian novelists
Norwegian children's writers
Norwegian male novelists
20th-century Norwegian male writers
21st-century Norwegian male writers
Nynorsk-language writers